Fånga mig när jag faller (Swedish for Catch Me When I'm Falling) is the debut studio album by Swedish singer Victor Leksell. It was released on 17 June 2020 by Sony Music Sweden and Virrejao.

The album has spawned six singles, including the Sweden top ten singles "Allt för mig", "Tappat", "Klär av dig", "Fantasi", and "Svag", with the last becoming Leksell's first number-one single in Sweden. "Svag" also topped in Norway and reached top 40 in Denmark.

Promotion

Singles
"Vart du sover" was released as Leksell's debut single and the album's lead single on 25 May 2018 through 2AM Music. The song debuted at number 75 in Sweden and stayed there for three weeks. After the release of the album, "Vart du sover" re-entered the chart and reached its new peak of number 49.

"Tappat" was released as the second single from the album and Leksell's first single through the major music label, Sony Music Sweden. The song instantly earned the singer his first top ten single, debuting at number eight, and peaked at number six on the following week. The song has charted on the Sverigetopplistan chart for 40 non-consecutive weeks and received a double platinum certification from the Swedish Recording Industry Association (GLF).

"Allt för mig" was released on 25 January 2019 as the third single from the album. The song debuted and peaked at number four on the Sverigetopplistan chart before dropping the top 100 after ten weeks. "Allt för mig" re-entered the chart after the release of Fånga mig när jag faller at number 86.

"Klär av dig" was released as the fourth single from the album. The song debuted at number 10 and peaked at number eight in its third week on the Sverigetopplistan chart. The song has charted on the chart for fifty weeks, becoming Leksell's longest-charting song.

"Svag" was released as the fifth single from the album to a commercial success. The song debuted at number one and has held the position for 13 non-consecutive weeks, earning triple platinum certification from GLF. The song also reached number one in Norway and stayed on the spot for 10 consecutive weeks, as well as reaching top 40 in Denmark.

"Fantasi" was released as the sixth single from the album. The song debuted and peaked at number seven in Sweden.

Commercial performance
Fånga mig när jag faller debuted at number one on the Swedish Sverigetopplistan chart, replacing Yasin's 98.01.11, and stayed at the spot for 18 weeks. In Norway, the album debuted at number four on the VG-lista and climbed to number three in the following week. On its first week of release, all the songs from the album charted inside the top 100 in Sweden, as well as Leksell's two other singles "Sverige" and "Bra för dig".

Track listing

Charts

Weekly charts

Year-end charts

References

2020 debut albums
Sony Music albums
Swedish-language albums